The Canadian province of Quebec first required its residents to register their motor vehicles in 1906. Registrants provided their own licence plates for display until 1908, when the province began to issue plates. Plates are currently issued by the Société de l'assurance automobile du Québec (Quebec Automobile Insurance Corporation).

From 1963 to 1977 (except 1967), licence plates carried the slogan La Belle Province ("The Beautiful Province"), a nickname for Quebec. Since 1978, they have carried Je me souviens ("I remember"), the official motto of the province.

Since 1979, Quebec legislation has required only rear plates, though there are certain cases where front plates are also required. Annual renewal stickers were used from 1979 to 1992; Quebec is currently one of five provinces where such stickers are not used (the others being Saskatchewan, Manitoba, British Columbia and Ontario). Dates for renewals of plates on passenger vehicles are determined based on the first letter of the registered owner's surname, while for other vehicles they are determined based on the type of vehicle: for example, plates on passenger vehicles whose owners' surnames begin with the letter 'L' are to be renewed in September, as are school bus plates. Registrations and fees may be renewed up to three months in advance. Trailer plates ("R" category) are not renewed annually: they are only registered upon initial purchase, or when transferred to another owner. Enforcement is done by a variety of methods, including automated number plate recognition.

Vehicles registered in Quebec can only display approved plates. Decorative designs are permitted at the front of the vehicles, but displaying a plate with a design that can be "confused" with an official plate, or an official plate from any other jurisdiction, is an offence under articles 34 and 56 of the Highway Safety Code and punishable with a fine.

Relief Design Inc., of Saint-Louis-de-Blandford, Quebec, is the sole producer of licence plates on behalf of the SAAQ. The company is a sister company of Amherst, Nova Scotia-based Waldale Manufacturing Ltd.

Size and specifications
Quebec vehicle registration plates come in two sizes
 Standard: 30 cm × 15 cm (12 in × 6 in)
 Small (Motorcycles, Mopeds, and Off-road vehicles): 20 cm x 10 cm (8 in x 4 in)

Quebec vehicle registration plates also come in two colours
 Standard: Blue on White (Matching the blue of The provincial flag)
 Electric Vehicles: Green on White

Vehicle categories
Certain vehicle categories are indicated on plates by the use of prefixes:

Active categories

Taxi plates phase-out
The provincial government ceased the issuance of T plates on October 10, 2020, and phased out T plates on October 13, 2020, and March 31, 2021, following the enactment of a law to modernize the taxi industry. All T plates have been converted to either regular or commercial (F) plates.

Retired categories

Passenger baseplates

1908 to 1978
The 1955 (dated 1956) issue was the first Quebec licence plate that complied with these standards.

1979 to present

Optional plates

Non-passenger plates

Taxis
The provincial government ceased the issuance of T plates on October 10, 2020, and phased out T plates on October 13, 2020, and March 31, 2021, following the enactment of a law to modernize the taxi industry. All T plates have been converted to either regular or commercial (F) plates.

References

External links
Québec licence plates, 1969–present
Vehicle Registration: Frequently Asked Questions (Société de l'assurance automobile du Québec)
Québec licence plates, Canada background (In Spanish)

1912 establishments in Quebec
Quebec
Transport in Quebec
Quebec-related lists